Shane MacEachern (born December 14, 1967) is a Canadian former professional ice hockey centre. He played one game with the St. Louis Blues in the 1987–88 season.

See also
List of players who played only one game in the NHL

External links

1967 births
Living people
Brantford Smoke players
Canadian ice hockey centres
Hull Olympiques players
Sportspeople from Charlottetown
Peoria Rivermen (IHL) players
SC Lyss players
St. Louis Blues players
Undrafted National Hockey League players
Verdun Junior Canadiens players
Verdun Juniors players
Ice hockey people from Prince Edward Island